Robert DeLaurentis (born January 11, 1966) is an American aviator, businessman and author. He was the first solo pilot to fly a Piper Malibu Mirage, a small, single-engine plane, around the world from May 17, 2015 to August 14, 2015. The flight covered 26,000 nautical miles and 23 countries in the ninety-eight days for a fundraising campaign to support aviation programs. On August 10, 2020, DeLaurentis completed a nine-month, 26,000 nautical mile polar circumnavigation and global peace mission, "One Planet, One People, One Plane: Oneness for Humanity" in his modified 1983 aircraft named "Citizen of the World".

Early life and education

DeLaurentis was born in Salamanca, New York, moved to the Bay area and Indonesia and finally settled in San Diego, California. Following an undergraduate degree in Accounting from USC, he earned an advanced graduate degree in Spiritual Psychology from the University of Santa Monica. From 1989 to 2006, DeLaurentis served in the United States Navy, earning rank of Lieutenant Commander. In 1995, following his Navy career, he founded a real estate development company, Innorev Enterprises, Inc. with projects throughout San Diego, California.

Career

2015 circumnavigation

DeLaurentis decided to attempt to fly solo around the world to raise awareness and funding for programs at Lindbergh-Schweitzer Elementary and AOPA (Aircraft Owners and Pilots Association) Flight Training Scholarship Program by the name "The Spirit of San Diego". He was testing new aviation technology to make aviation more affordable and safer. Departing Lindbergh Field, San Diego, California, in the single engine Piper Malibu Mirage named 'Spirit of San Diego' on May 17, 2015, DeLaurentis covered 26,000 nautical miles and 23 countries in the ninety-eight days.

2019–2020 Pole-to-pole circumnavigation

On his second circumnavigation, DeLaurentis used a modified 1983 Turbine Commander 900 twin-engine plane he named "Citizen of the World". Due to the COVID-19 pandemic, the planned five-month Pole-to-Pole peace mission turned into a nine-month mission.

Showcasing and promoting 95 sponsors from around the world, "Citizen of the World’s" polar circumnavigation including many national partners and local San Diego aviation and communication technology businesses that serviced and supported the aircraft and pilot in flying the longest distance in a twin-engine or single-engine turboprop—18.1 hours in flight—and becoming the first and fastest polar circumnavigation in the world in a twin-engine or single-engine turboprop.

Following two initial departure delays due to issues with new technology installations in the aircraft, DeLaurentis departed from San Diego County’s Gillespie Field on November 17, 2019 with the intention of crossing the South Pole and then the North Pole before returning home. DeLaurentis stopped in 22 different countries along the way, interviewing NGO leaders and local residents for an upcoming documentary, "Peace Pilot: To the Ends of the Earth and Beyond".

Bibliography

DeLaurentis has authored the books "Flying Thru Life: How to Grow Your Business and Relationships with Applied Spirituality", "Zen Pilot: Flight of Passion and the Journey Within", and the children’s book "The Little Plane That Could". His next book, "Peace Pilot: To the Ends of the Earth and Beyond", will be released in 2021.

See also

 List of circumnavigations

References

External links
 

Living people
1966 births
American businesspeople
Aviators from New York (state)
American non-fiction writers
American aviation writers